Lomami may refer to:
 Lomami River, a river in the Democratic Republic of the Congo
 Lomami Province, a province of the Democratic Republic of the Congo
 Lomami Province (former), a former province of Zaire